James Ulmer is an entertainment journalist who created a ranking list of actors, known as the "Ulmer scale". Ulmer is also the author of the books James Ulmer's Hollywood Hot List – The Complete Guide to Star Ranking and the Directors Hot List, which measure the global value of stars and directors in a variety of areas. These include bankability, career management, professionalism, promotion, risk factors, and talent.

Personal
Ulmer obtained his degree from Harvard College and during his time there, he was the editor of The Harvard Crimson. He is an Iowa native. When Ulmer is not working, he enjoys playing 
ragtime piano and shooting and editing videos.

Career
Ulmer has been working in journalism for over 20 years. He is a contributing editor for The New York Times and two national columns for Premiere Magazine. He has also written for Variety, The Los Angeles Times and The Observer in London. He has also spent eight years as international editor and columnist for The Hollywood Reporter where he was responsible for supervising a team of 35 correspondents and reporting across the world at film festivals and markets.

Ulmer has been interviewed by a number of publications and media outlets which include: The Wall Street Journal, The New York Times Magazine, The Los Angeles Times and Newsweek and he has also appeared frequently on Entertainment Tonight, CBS This Morning, CNN Showbiz Today, Voice of America, HBO, BBC, FOX, and E!.

Honors and awards
Ulmer was nominated for a Press Award by the Publicists Guild of America.

Organizations
He served on the competition jury for the Cairo International Film Festival.

References

External links
 Interview with James Ulmer
  About James Ulmer, the Ulmer scale and the "Hot List"

American male journalists
Harvard College alumni
People from Iowa
Living people
Year of birth missing (living people)
The Harvard Crimson people